Montell Marcelle Douglas (born 24 January 1986) is a British sportswoman. Originally a sprinter and former British record holder for the 100 metres at 11.05 seconds. In 2016, she took up bobsleigh and became part of the Great Britain women's two-woman bobsleigh team the following year. She competed at the 2022 Winter Olympics.

Athletics career
Douglas made her first senior major championship appearance at the 2007 European Athletics Indoor Championships. Although she was knocked out in the semi-finals, she set a new 60 metres personal best of 7.28 seconds.

She was part of the British 4 x 100 metres relay team that finished fourth at the 2007 World Championships in Athletics in Osaka (along with Laura Turner, Joice Maduaka and Emily Freeman). At the same championships, she competed in the 100 m individual event but was eliminated in the quarter-finals stage.

In the 2008 season, she finished second behind Jeanette Kwakye in the women's 100 m at the British Championships. At the Loughborough European Athletics meeting on 17 July, during the semi-final, she ran a wind-assisted (+2.6 m/s) time of 10.95 seconds. In the final, she broke Kathy Cook's British record with a time of 11.05 seconds. Douglas had improved her personal best by almost a quarter of a second and broken a national record which had stood unbeaten for over a quarter of a century in the process.

2008 Summer Olympics
Douglas represented Great Britain at the 2008 Olympics, in the 100 metres. In her first round heat, she placed second behind Ivet Lalova in a time of 11.36 to advance to the second round. There she failed to qualify for the semi-finals as her time of 11.38 was only the fourth fastest time of her heat, causing elimination. She was also part of the Great Britain team which reached the final of the 4x100 metres relay, and which (along with the Jamaican team) were favourites to claim a medal. Jeanette Kwakye ran a good first bend in the final, but the British team failed to finish due to a mix-up in the changeover between Douglas and Emily Freeman. Jamaica also failed to finish after a similar error between Sherone Simpson and Kerron Stewart.

Personal bests

All information taken from IAAF profile.

Bobsleigh career
In 2016, Douglas took up bobsleigh. She finished in the top 10 on her Bobsleigh World Cup debut in January 2017, and later in the season, she finished seventh at an event in St. Moritz. She was Great Britain's reserve athlete for the 2018 Winter Olympics in Pyeongchang. In 2019, Douglas and Mica McNeill finished sixth in the 2-women bobsleigh event in Königssee. In 2020, Douglas and McNeill came fourth in the 2020–21 Bobsleigh World Cup 2-women event in Innsbruck. In January 2022, Douglas and McNeill were selected for the 2-women event at the 2022 Winter Olympics. Douglas became the first female Briton to compete at the Summer and Winter Olympics, and notably, both were held in Beijing. The pair finished 17th in the two-woman event.

Outside sport
Douglas appeared on the game show Who Dares Wins on 14 January 2011 and won £12,500.

References

External links

1986 births
Living people
English female sprinters
Athletes (track and field) at the 2008 Summer Olympics
Athletes (track and field) at the 2010 Commonwealth Games
Commonwealth Games gold medallists for England
Black British sportswomen
Olympic athletes of Great Britain
Alumni of Brunel University London
Alumni of Middlesex University
People from the London Borough of Lewisham
British female sprinters
Commonwealth Games medallists in athletics
English female bobsledders
Olympic female sprinters
Bobsledders at the 2022 Winter Olympics
Olympic bobsledders of Great Britain
Medallists at the 2010 Commonwealth Games